3451 Mentor  is a large Jupiter trojan from the Trojan camp, approximately  in diameter. It was discovered on 19 April 1984, by Czech astronomer Antonín Mrkos at the Kleť Observatory in the Czech Republic. The uncommon Jovian X-type asteroid is one of the largest Jupiter trojans and has a rotation period of 7.7 hours. It was named after Mentor from Greek mythology. Mentor, a man who was rich in horse at Pedaeus. He was the father of the spearman Imbrius, an ally of the Trojans.

Orbit and classification 

Mentor is a large Jovian asteroid orbiting in the trailing Trojan camp at Jupiter's  Lagrangian point, 60° behind its orbit in a 1:1 resonance . It is also a non-family asteroid of the Jovian background population.

It orbits the Sun at a distance of 4.8–5.5 AU once every 11 years and 8 months (4,254 days; semi-major axis of 5.14 AU). Its orbit has an eccentricity of 0.07 and an inclination of 25° with respect to the ecliptic. The body's observation arc begins at Crimea–Nauchnij in March 1983, one year prior to its official discovery observation at Klet.

Physical characteristics 

Mentor is an X-type asteroid, according to the SMASS classification, the SDSS-based taxonomy and observations by Pan-STARRS. It has also been characterized as a primitive P-type asteroid by the Wide-field Infrared Survey Explorer (WISE), and as an assumed, carbonaceous C-type by the Collaborative Asteroid Lightcurve Link (CALL). Its V–I color index of 0.77 is notably lower than that of a Jovian D-type asteroid, which is the dominant spectral type among the Jupiter trojans (also see table below).

Rotation period 

A large number of rotational lightcurves of Mentor have been obtained, since its first photometric observations by William Hartmann (1988). Follow-up observations by Mottola at the Calar Alto Observatory in July 1998 gave a refined period of  hours and an amplitude of  magnitude.

In 2006 and 2007, photometric observations of Mentor were made at the Roque de los Muchachos (7.68 and 7.682 h) and Oakley Observatory (7.70 h). Additional period determinations by Laurent Bernasconi (7.699 h) Federico Manzini (>6 h) and René Roy (7.727 and 7.6 h) were made between 2006 and 2010, and reported at Behrend's website. In 2012, observations in the R- and S-band at the Palomar Transient Factory gave a period of 7.694 and 7.677 hours.

Follow-up observations by Daniel Coley and Robert Stephens at GMARS  in 2010, and the Center for Solar System Studies during 2013–2017, measured four well-defined periods including  and  hours with a brightness amplitude of 0.46 and 0.21 magnitude, respectively.

Diameter and albedo 

According to the surveys carried out by the Japanese Akari satellite and the NEOWISE mission of NASA's WISE telescope, Mentor measures 117.91 and 126.29 kilometers in diameter and its surface has an albedo of 0.075 and 0.044, respectively. CALL assumes a standard albedo for a carbonaceous asteroid of 0.057 and calculates a diameter of 116.30 kilometers based on an absolute magnitude of 8.4. Mentor together with 624 Hektor and 884 Priamus are the three largest Jupiter trojans for which the Supplemental IRAS Minor Planet Survey (SIMPS), conducted by IRAS, provides no data (in the table below, placeholder figures from the LCDB are shown instead).

Naming 

This minor planet was named by the discoverer from Greek mythology after Mentor, father of Imbrius and son of spearman Imbrus at Pedaseus. Mentor fought with the Trojans against the Greeks in the Trojan War. In Homer's Iliad, he was described as a man who was rich in horse. The official naming citation was published by the Minor Planet Center on 29 November 1993.

Notes

References

External links 
 Lightcurve Database Query (LCDB), at www.minorplanet.info
 Dictionary of Minor Planet Names, Google books
 Asteroids and comets rotation curves, CdR – Geneva Observatory, Raoul Behrend
 Discovery Circumstances: Numbered Minor Planets (1)-(5000) – Minor Planet Center
 
 

003451
Discoveries by Antonín Mrkos
Named minor planets
003451
19840419